The 1999 season was the Oakland Raiders' 30th in the National Football League (NFL), their 40th overall, their fifth season since returning to Oakland, and their second season under head coach Jon Gruden. They matched their previous season's output of 8–8. Thirteen of the team's sixteen games were decided by a touchdown or less, and none of the Raiders' eight losses were by more than a touchdown.

The season saw the team acquire quarterback Rich Gannon, who had his best seasons with the Raiders, being named MVP in 2002 and leading the team to a Super Bowl, that same season. His following two seasons after the Super Bowl were marred by injuries and he was forced to retire in 2004. Gannon was named to four consecutive Pro Bowls (1999–2002) while playing for the Raiders.

Offseason

NFL draft

Staff

Roster

Schedule

Standings

References 

Oakland Raiders seasons
Oakland Raiders
Oakland